Pincushion cactus is a common name for several cacti and may refer to:
 Escobaria
 Mammillaria
 Pediocactus